Hampi  is a town in the Vijayanagara district in the Indian state of Karnataka. Located along the Tungabhadra River in the east and center part of the state, Hampi is near the city of Hosapete. It is famous for hosting the Hampi Group of Monuments, a UNESCO World Heritage Site.

Hampi is mentioned in Ashokan epigraphy and texts such as the Ramayana and the Puranas of Hinduism as Pampaa Devi Tirtha Kshetra. Hampi was a part of Vijayanara, the capital of the Hindu Vijayanagara Empire in the 14th-century. It became a center of economic and administrative activity of the Deccan region kingdom founded in opposition to Islamic Sultanates in South India. After over two centuries of rule, the Empire was defeated and abandoned. Since the 19th-century, its ruins became an important site for archaeologists and historians.

Geography
Hampi is situated on the banks of the Tungabhadra River, midst rocky hills. The closest railway station is in the city of Hosapete (Hospet), 13 km away.

Economic activity
The principal economic activity in and around the town include agriculture, tourism and industrial activity related to iron ore, manganese and other minerals mining. The average rainfall around Hampi town is about 660 mm. The major crops grown are paddy, maize, jowar, bajra, groundnut, sunflower, sugarcane and cotton. Part of the Hampi farmlands are irrigated and there is a large dam nearby.

Tourism
Hampi hosts, in part, a group of monuments that UNESCO has declared a world heritage site.

In and after the 1960s, the town became an attraction for motorbikers and a site for offbeat tourism when its infrastructure was in poor state. Groups of tourists would gather on its hills and midst its ruins, to hold parties and spiritual retreats, and these have been called "Hampi Hippies" and Hampi as the "lost city" in some publications.

The annual Hampi Utsava or  "Vijaya Festival" has been celebrated since the reign of Vijayanagara. It is organized by the Government of Karnataka as Nada Habba (Festival). more than 1 million people visit this place.

Climate

See also

 Anegundi
 Hosapete

References

 S.Srinivasachar, T.S.Satyan, Hampi : The fabled capital of the Vijayanagara Empire, (Directorate of Archaeology and Museums), Govt. of Karnataka, 1995

External links

 Archaeological Survey of India Museum Hampi
 Group of Monuments at Hampi - UNESCO World Heritage List 
 Architectural Wonder Hampi 
 Hampi @ Karnataka.com

Former capital cities in India
Tourist attractions in Karnataka